The United Kingdom participated in the Eurovision Song Contest 2022 in Turin, Italy. British singer-songwriter Sam Ryder represented the country with his song "Space Man", which he co-wrote with Max Wolfgang and Amy Wadge. He was selected as the 2022 UK entrant by the British Broadcasting Corporation (BBC) in collaboration with record label TaP Music and their management company.

Ryder performed in the second half of the Eurovision final, in 22nd position. He finished in second place with 466 points, winning the jury vote with 283 points, scoring the third highest jury votes by a contestant. Ryder also became the highest scoring UK Eurovision entrant and scored the UK its best result since 1998 and its first top three result since 2002. It also marked the sixteenth time that the UK has finished in second place in the contest.

An average of 9.3 million people watched the final on BBC One, with a peak viewing figure later reaching 10.6 million, the highest UK viewing figures for the contest since 2011. It was the most-watched televised programme in the UK of that year before being surpassed by the Platinum Party at the Palace, and delivered the largest number of viewers for the contest that year across all European markets. Furthermore it was the fourth most watched show in the UK of 2022. "Space Man" peaked at number two on the UK Singles Chart, becoming the highest-charting UK Eurovision entry since Gina G's "Ooh Aah... Just a Little Bit" in 1996.

Background

Prior to the 2022 contest, the United Kingdom has participated in the Eurovision Song Contest sixty-three times. To this point, the nation was noted for having finished as the runner-up in a record fifteen contests. In , the United Kingdom finished in last place with the song "Embers" performed by James Newman, notably scoring a total of 0 points from both the juries and the televoting.

The British national broadcaster, the BBC, broadcasts the event within the United Kingdom and organises the selection process for the nation's entry. Between 2011 and 2015, the BBC opted to internally select the British entry. For their 2016 entry, the broadcaster announced that a national final would be organised featuring a competition among several artists and songs to choose the British entry for the contest. The same process was used in 2017 and 2018, and changes were brought in for 2019. In 2020 and 2021, the BBC opted to return to an internal selection, in collaboration with record label BMG.

Before Eurovision

Internal selection 
On 21 October 2021, the day after the official list of participants in Eurovision 2022 was released, the BBC announced its plans for the British national selection, opting for an internal process no longer in collaboration with record label BMG, but with TaP Music instead. The management company's leading artists include Dua Lipa, Ellie Goulding and Lana Del Rey. Kate Phillips (BBC commissioning editor) stated that the new collaboration "will enable the BBC to tap into some great music talent" and that the broadcaster has "big ambitions for the 2022 contest". On 25 January 2022, TaP revealed that they had started shortlisting potential acts for the contest – with both established, emerging and brand new artists having approached them for the Eurovision project – and that they had worked with BBC Radio 1 and Scott Mills in order to choose the British representative.

In November 2021, Glasgow-based electropop duo HYYTS revealed they were in the running to represent the United Kingdom; which was confirmed during an interview with BBC Scotland's TV channel programme The Edit broadcast on 29 January 2022. It had been rumoured that Chelcee Grimes was chosen as the UK representative, being unofficially announced as the British entrant in early February during Jenni Falconer's morning show on Smooth London. Grimes herself later denied this on Twitter the same day. It had also been speculated that Sam Ryder would represent the country with his song "Space Man". Ryder was announced as the chosen entrant on 10 March 2022. The entry was revealed by Scott Mills on BBC Radio 1's breakfast show with Greg James, with "Space Man" having previously featured as 'Tune of the Week' on Mills' afternoon show on Radio 1.

Promotion 
In order to promote "Space Man" as the British entry for the 2022 contest, Ryder embarked on a promotion tour throughout Europe. Following the announcement that he would be representing the UK at Eurovision, Space Man had its TV debut performance on BBC's The One Show, and he was interviewed on the same day. Ryder also promoted the song in Bulgaria on 21 March after filming the UK 'live-on-tape' backup performance in Sofia, alongside entrants from Bulgaria, Cyprus and Greece. Ryder also performed at the London Eurovision Party at London's Hard Rock Hotel venue on 3 April, the Eurovision in Concert 2022 at Amsterdam's AFAS Live on 9 April, and at the PrePartyES in Madrid's Sala La Riviera on 16 April. He also made appearances on Dutch radio stations on 7 April. On 14 April, he travelled to Belgrade, Serbia in order to promote his entry on Serbian radio and on the  show. He then travelled to Madrid the day after for the PrePartyES. Ryder also made further promotional appearances in Greece, San Marino and Germany.

Following his interviews on This Morning and Good Morning Britain, he was praised for his positive attitude to see change in how the British public and press views the Eurovision Song Contest. On 22 April 2022, the song was performed at the York Hall for Eurovision House Party.

Prior to the contest, the BBC also released a documentary following Ryder's journey to Eurovision, with in-depth interviews and footage of the production process of "Space Man".

At Eurovision 

The Eurovision Song Contest 2022 took place at PalaOlimpico in Turin, Italy, and consisted of two semi-finals held on 10 and 12 May, and the final on 14 May 2022. As the United Kingdom is a member of the "Big Five", their entry directly qualified for the final, along with France, Germany, Spain, and Italy (also the host country in 2022). The United Kingdom performed in the second half of the final in position number 22. In addition to their participation in the final, the United Kingdom was also required to broadcast and vote in one of the two semi-finals. This was decided via a draw held during the semi-final allocation draw on 25 January 2022, when it was announced that the United Kingdom would be voting in the second semi-final.

Both semi-finals were broadcast on BBC Three and BBC iPlayer, with the commentary team consisting of Scott Mills and Rylan Clark. This marked the return of the Eurovision semi-finals to BBC Three for the first time since 2015, after four years of broadcasting the shows on BBC Four during BBC Three's tenure as an online channel. The final was broadcast on BBC One's regional variations across the UK with commentary by Graham Norton, and on BBC Radio 2 with commentary by Ken Bruce. The BBC also broadcast a Eurovision after-party on BBC Radio 2, which was presented by OJ Borg. The UK spokesperson, who announced the top 12-point score awarded by the British jury during the final, was AJ Odudu.

On 20 January 2022, it was announced that the BBC would move their coverage of the contest from London to Salford, meaning that the UK spokesperson in 2022, AJ Odudu, was the first in the history of the contest to announce the points of UK the national jury live from Salford. It was later announced that the consultancy fees would be donated to the charitable organization Migrant Offshore Aid Station, in order to support individuals who were affected by the 2022 Russian invasion of Ukraine.

Final 
Ryder took part in technical rehearsals on 5 and 7 May, followed by dress rehearsals on 11, 12 and 13 May. This included the semi-final jury show on 11 May, where an extended clip of the British performance, was filmed for broadcast during the live show on 12 May, and the jury final on 13 May, where the professional juries of each country watched and voted on the competing entries. After technical rehearsals, the "Big Five" countries held a press conference. As part of this press conference, the artists took part in a draw to determine which half of the grand final they would subsequently participate in. The United Kingdom was drawn to compete in the second half. Following the conclusion of the second semi-final, the shows' producers decided upon the running order of the final. The running order for the semi-finals and final was decided by the shows' producers rather than through another draw, so that similar songs were not placed next to each other. The United Kingdom was subsequently placed to perform in position 22, following the entry from Australia and before the entry from Poland.

The British performance featured Ryder performing on a predominately black and white stage theme, with smoke effects on the floor, whilst wearing trainers and a skydiver jumpsuit with intricate patterns, with an astronomical theme linking back to the meaning of "Space Man". The United Kingdom brought the largest prop of the contest, which was formed of three metal wings, while Ryder performed on a circular plinth in the centre. The prop moved during the course of the performance, and gradually lit up and opened. The performance also featured a guitar solo by Ryder, an adaptation of the studio cut of "Space Man". Ryder received a total of 466 points, finishing in first place with the juries and fifth place with the public: 183 points from the televoting and 283 points from the juries.

Voting 

Below is a breakdown of points awarded to the United Kingdom in the final. Voting during the three shows involved each country awarding two sets of points from 1-8, 10 and 12: one from their professional jury and the other from televoting. The exact composition of the professional jury, and the results of each country's jury and televoting were released after the final; the individual results from each jury member were also released in an anonymised form. The British jury consisted of Adam Hunter, Denise Pearson, Eliot Kennedy, Matthew Xia (Excalibah), and Helen George. In the final, the United Kingdom placed 2nd with 466 points. This was the best British result achieved since 1998 and the most points ever attained at the contest by the United Kingdom.

In the jury vote, the United Kingdom only failed to score points from Armenia, Australia, Croatia and Greece, while also receiving no points in the televote from Croatia, Montenegro, North Macedonia, Serbia and Slovenia.

Points awarded to the United Kingdom

Points awarded by the United Kingdom

Detailed voting results
Each nation's jury consisted of five music industry professionals who are citizens of the country they represent, with their names published before the contest to ensure transparency. This jury judged each entry based on: vocal capacity; the stage performance; the song's composition and originality; and the overall impression by the act. In addition, no member of a national jury was permitted to be related in any way to any of the competing acts in such a way that they cannot vote impartially and independently. The individual rankings of each jury member as well as the nation's televoting results were released shortly after the grand final.

The following members comprised the British jury:
 Adam Hunter – songwriter, music producer, member of HYYTS
 Denise Pearson – singer-songwriter, music producer
 Eliot Kennedy – singer-songwriter
 Matthew Xia (Excalibah) – theatre director, DJ, composer, broadcaster, journalist
 Helen George – actress, TV host

After Eurovision 
The long-awaited success of the United Kingdom in the Eurovision Song Contest 2022 was greeted with tremendous reception across the UK, with commentators Graham Norton stating that the result was a "fairytale ending to an incredible evening" and Ken Bruce proclaiming that "the feeling is that the UK has broken the taboo of bad results". An average of 8.9 million viewers watched the final, with a peak of 10.6 million during the voting sequence. This equalled a 55% share of the market over the four hours of the final, equalling record viewing figures achieved in 2011. Shortly after the final, the UK head of delegation Andrew Cartmell verbally confirmed the country's participation in the 2023 contest, stating that the UK aims to maintain the success of 2022 for the following year. Sam Ryder stated that he was "delighted with the result" and that "the UK will be a force to be reckoned with in the future of Eurovision". On 16 May 2022, Ryder was awaited by a crowd of fans and press at London's Heathrow Airport to celebrate his success.

"Space Man" reached number one on The Official Big Top 40 charts. The song reached the top fifteen in Lithuania and Sweden and the top thirty in Iceland. It reached number twenty-two in Ireland, becoming the highest charting UK Eurovision entry on the Irish Singles Chart since 2014. It also charted in the Netherlands and Switzerland.

Following Ryder's Eurovision success, on 18 May 2022, he was announced as one of the headliners for the BBC's Platinum Jubilee concert, Platinum Party at the Palace, on 4 June 2022, where he performed a Jubilee version of "Space Man" outside Buckingham Palace in front of an estimated twenty-two thousand spectators.

On 25 July 2022, the EBU, Ukrainian broadcaster UA:PBC and the BBC announced that the  would be held in the UK, after Ukraine was unable to meet the demands of hosting the event due to security concerns caused by the Russian invasion of the country, with the UK being chosen to host after the country's second-place finish in the 2022 contest.

Awards and nominations 
Ryder won the Marcel Bezençon Press Award, and became the first UK act to win a Bezençon Award.

References

External links
 BBC's official Eurovision website

Countries in the Eurovision Song Contest 2022
United Kingdom in the Eurovision Song Contest
Eurovision Song Contest
Eurovision Song Contest